Richard Wade Wehr (December 9, 1925 – December 1, 2011) was an American professional basketball player and college coach. 

Wehr played college basketball for the Rice Owls and was a first-team All-Southwest Conference selection in 1945. Wehr was selected in the 1948 BAA draft by the Indianapolis Jets. He played for the Jets in nine games, recording 12 points and 3 assists.

Wehr coached Georgia State University's men's basketball and golf teams following his playing career.

BAA career statistics

Regular season

Head coaching record

References

External links

1925 births
2011 deaths
American men's basketball coaches
American men's basketball players
Basketball coaches from Ohio
Basketball players from Ohio
College golf coaches in the United States 
Denison University alumni 
Florida State University alumni 
Forwards (basketball)
Georgia State Panthers men's basketball coaches
High school basketball coaches in the United States
Indiana Hoosiers men's basketball players
Indianapolis Jets draft picks
Indianapolis Jets players
People from Caldwell, Ohio
Rice Owls men's basketball players
Saint Mary's College of California alumni
University of Pittsburgh alumni